Uma Maheswari, known by her stage names Sivaranjani and Ooha, is a former Indian actress. She worked primarily in Telugu and Tamil films, in addition to Malayalam films in the 1990s. She received Nandi Award for Best Actress for Aame (1994).

Personal life
Ooha married actor Srikanth in 1997 and the couple has three children Roshan, Medha and Rohan.

Filmography

Television
 En iniya Enthira

References

External links
 

Living people
Year of birth missing (living people)
Actresses in Telugu cinema
Indian film actresses
Actresses in Tamil cinema
Actresses in Malayalam cinema
20th-century Indian actresses
Actresses in Kannada cinema
Actresses from Kerala
Actresses in Tamil television